The Bahau railway station is a Malaysian railway station located in and named after the town of Bahau, Jempol District, Negeri Sembilan. Located near Taman Kwang Hup, it is one of the major railway stations of KTM's East Coast Line meaning that available express trains will also stop at this station.

Services
The station currently only provides KTM Intercity services with the sole express train daily to and from JB Sentral from 2017 onwards. Prior to the absorption of KTM ETS services into the KTM Intercity division, the station previously ran mail trains to and from Tumpat and Gemas, with express trains from Tanjong Pagar (until July 2011) and Woodlands in Singapore on its schedule.

External links
 Bahau Railway Station

Jempol District
KTM East Coast Line stations
Railway stations opened in 1910
Railway stations in Negeri Sembilan